Lucien Laval (1 February 1903 – 21 April 1969) was a French racing cyclist. He rode in the 1928 Tour de France.

References

1903 births
1969 deaths
French male cyclists
Place of birth missing